Werner Krämer (23 January 1940 – 12 February 2010) was a German football player, who was a household name to the West German football audience under his nickname Eia Krämer. He was born in Duisburg, Germany.

Club career 
He scored 49 goals in 192 Bundesliga matches.

International career 
Krämer won 13 caps for West Germany in the 1960s.

Career statistics

Club

Scores and results list West Germany's goal tally first.

Notes

References

External links 
 
 
 
 

1940 births
2010 deaths
German footballers
Germany international footballers
Germany B international footballers
Germany under-21 international footballers
MSV Duisburg players
Hamburger SV players
VfL Bochum players
Bundesliga players
1966 FIFA World Cup players
Association football midfielders
Footballers from Duisburg
West German footballers